Robert Bernardis (7 August 1908 in Innsbruck – 8 August 1944 in Berlin-Plötzensee) was a German army officer and Austrian resistance fighter involved in the attempt to kill Nazi Germany's dictator Adolf Hitler in the 20 July Plot in 1944.

After finishing the military academy in Enns and Klosterneuburg Austria, Bernardis started his military career as a lieutenant in Linz. After the Anschluss in 1938, he accepted the new regime, but remained critical. However, once the Second World War had begun, experiences at the front such as witnessing the murder of civilians changed his mind and he became involved in the resistance movement against the Third Reich. He was assigned to the German General Staff by May 1942.

By 1944, though still relatively young, he held the rank of an Oberstleutnant. He was not stationed near Hitler's headquarters at Wolfsschanze near Rastenburg when the 20 July assassination attempt was carried out, but was in Berlin instead. Unaware that the bomb had failed to kill Hitler, Bernadis was responsible for the order that set Operation Valkyrie in motion. That same evening, he was arrested by the Gestapo. On 8 August, he was sentenced to death by the German "People's Court" (Volksgerichtshof) and executed the same day.

Despite being deported to a concentration camp, Bernardis's family survived the war.

Portrayal in the media
In the 2004 German production, Stauffenberg, Bernardis is portrayed by actor Michael Bornhütter.

Sources
Karl-Reinhart Trauner:Mit Stauffenberg gegen Hitler:Oberstleutnant i.G. Robert Bernardis, Tillinger-Verlag, Szentendre 2008,  (no translations)
Karl Glaubauf:Robert Bernardis-Österreichs Stauffenberg, Wien 1994, Eigenverlag
Karl Glaubauf:Robert Bernardis - Österreichs Stauffenberg, in: Austria-Forum, Internet - Lexicon,Graz 2010.

1908 births
1944 deaths
Military personnel from Innsbruck
People from the County of Tyrol
Austrian military personnel of World War II
Executed members of the 20 July plot
Executions at Plötzensee Prison
Austrian people executed by Nazi Germany
German Army officers of World War II